From a Boy to a Man is the seventh studio album from American rapper San Quinn.

Track listing
 "Boy To A Man" (Intro)
 "They're All Waitin' On Me"
 "Wind It Up"
 "Double Dose Of Gangsta" (featuring CHOPS)
 "Rockin' Up Work"
 "Reinforced Steel" (featuring P.S.D. Tha Drivah and Cozmo)
 "We All Gone Eat"
 "My Brother" (featuring Bailey) produced by: Automatic
 "Upside Down"
 "Dreamin' Of Riches" (featuring Homewrecka)
 "3rd Eye"
 "Catch A Body" (featuring Boo Banga) produced by: Automatic
 "Billionaire" (What We Call Livin') (featuring Lil Quinn)
 "Ready To Go" (featuring Willie Hen)
 "One Of Them Gangstas" (featuring 18)
 "My Zone"
 "Devotion" (featuring Too Short, Mistah F.A.B. and Chops)
 "Do Ya Thizzle" (Bonus track)
 "Kill The Connect" (Bonus track)

Chart positions

References

2008 albums
Albums produced by Cozmo
San Quinn albums
SMC Recordings albums